Bdelyropsis is a genus of scarab beetles (Scarabaeidae).

Scarabaeidae